The 2016 Wokingham Borough Council election took place on 5 May 2016 to elect members of Wokingham Borough Council in England. This was on the same day as other local elections.

Election result
The Conservatives retained control of the council and gained one seat from an Independent Candidate.

Ward results

21 ballot papers were rejected

4 ballot papers were rejected

19 ballot papers were rejected

23 ballot papers were rejected

12 ballot papers were rejected

13 ballot papers were rejected

13 ballot papers were rejected

18 ballot papers were rejected

8 ballot papers were rejected.

12 ballot papers were rejected

16 ballot papers were rejected

15 ballot papers were rejected

13 ballot papers were rejected.

14 ballot papers were rejected

14 ballot papers were rejected

10 ballot papers were rejected

11 ballot papers were rejected

11 ballot papers were rejected

References

2016 English local elections
2016
2010s in Berkshire